Thamer Enad Al-Enazi (born 23 May 1970) is a Kuwait football manager.

Playing career
During his player career, Enad played for Kuwaiti club Al-Sulaibikhat. He also competed in the men's tournament at the 1992 Summer Olympics.

Managerial career
In 2003, after retiring from football, Enad re-joined Al-Sulaibikhat as manager. After leaving the club in 2010, Enad once again assumed managerial duties of the club for the 2013–14 Kuwaiti Premier League. In September 2019, Enad was appointed manager of Kuwait.

References

External links
 
 

1970 births
Living people
Kuwaiti footballers
Al-Sulaibikhat SC players
Kuwaiti football managers
Kuwait national football team managers
Al-Sulaibikhat SC managers
Al Jahra SC managers
Kuwait Premier League players
Kuwait Premier League managers
Olympic footballers of Kuwait
Footballers at the 1992 Summer Olympics
Al-Salmiya SC managers
Association football forwards